During the 1947–48 Scottish football season, Celtic competed in Scottish Division A.

Results

Scottish Division A

Scottish Cup

Scottish League Cup

References

Celtic F.C. seasons
Celtic